Atrak may refer to:

A-Trak (born 1982), Canadian musician
Atrek River, a river in Iran
Atrak Rural District (disambiguation), administrative subdivisions of Iran
Atrak Air, an Iranian Airline

See also 
Adaptive Transform Acoustic Coding (ATRAC)